Eromosele Albert (born 27 July 1974) is a Nigerian former professional boxer. As an amateur, he competed at the 1996 and 2000 Summer Olympics.

Professional boxing record

References

External links
 Eromosele Albert at BoxStat.co
 
 
 

1974 births
Living people
Nigerian male boxers
Olympic boxers of Nigeria
Boxers at the 1996 Summer Olympics
Boxers at the 2000 Summer Olympics
Commonwealth Games silver medallists for Nigeria
Commonwealth Games medallists in boxing
Boxers at the 1994 Commonwealth Games
Middleweight boxers
African Games medalists in boxing
Sportspeople from Benin City
African Games silver medalists for Nigeria
Competitors at the 1999 All-Africa Games
Medallists at the 1994 Commonwealth Games